The 61st Georgia Infantry Regiment was an infantry regiment in the Confederate States Army during the American Civil War.

History
Part of the Lawton-Gordon-Evans Brigade, the 61st Georgia Volunteer Infantry was mustered in South Carolina in May 1862. Its service included the Battle of Gaines' Mill (27 June 1862), Second Manassas (29-30 August 1862), the Battle of Chancellorsville (29 April – 5 May 1863) and the Battle of Gettysburg (1-3 July 1863) among many other battles. Along with the rest of Gordon's brigade, the 61st was among the first Confederate troops to reach the Susquehanna River during the Gettysburg Campaign.

George Washington Nichols, in his autobiographical account, A Soldier's Story of His Regiment, depicts life in the 61st Georgia Volunteer Infantry during the Civil War.

Staff
Colonel
John H. Lamar

Lieutenant Colonels
 James McDonald
Charles W. McArthur
James Y. McDuffie

Majors
Peter Brenan
Archibald P. McRae
Henry Tillman
James D. Van Valkenburg
James Bell Smith

Captains
G.D. Willcox
D.R.A. Johnson
Daniel McDonald
S.H. Kennedy
Charles W. McArthur
Peter Brennan
W. Fannin
J.M. Dasher
James D. Van Valkenburg
E.F. Sharpe
T.M. McRae
J.A. Edmondson
T.T. Colley.

Adjutants
G.W. Lamar
G.C. Conner.

Assistant Quartermaster
George Higgins.

Companies
 A - "Irwin Cowboys" (Irwin County, Captains Willcox & McDuffie)
 B - "Tattnall Rangers" (Tattnall County, Captains Johnson & A.P. McRae)
 C - "Brooks Rifles" and "Wiregrass Riflemen" (Brooks and Thomas Counties, Captains McDonald & Edmonson)
 D - "DeKalb Guards" (Bulloch County, Captains Kennedy & Tillman)
 E - "Montgomery Sharpshooters" (Montgomery County, Captains McArthur & T.M. McRae)
 F - "The Stark/Starke Guards"
 G - "Wilkes Guards" (Wilkes County, Captains Fannin & Colley)
 H - "Tattnall Volunteers" (Tattnall County, Captain Dasher)
 I - "Thompson Guards" (Macon and Bibb County, Captain Van Valkenburg)
 K - formed with volunteers from Companies A-I (Captain Sharpe)

See also 
List of Civil War regiments from Georgia

References 
Nichols, Private G.W. 
Evans County Historical Society.  A History of Evans County, Georgia. Claxton, GA: Evans County Historical Society. 1999

External links 
The 61st Georgia Volunteer Infantry

Units and formations of the Confederate States Army from Georgia (U.S. state)
1861 establishments in Georgia (U.S. state)